Lucy Gossage (born 25 December 1979) is a British doctor and former triathlete and duathlete, who currently works at Nottingham University Hospitals NHS Trust. As an athlete, Gossage competed in Ironman Triathlon events, was twice European duathlon champion, and won multiple Ironman Triathlon events.

Sports career
In April 2012, Gossage won the European Women's duathlon title, and she retained the title in 2013, finishing the Powerman Duathlon World Series in second place in 2012.  Aged 34, she decided to become a full-time Ironman Triathlon competitor. She won her first Ironman event in 2013 in the United Kingdom, and later in the year won the Wales Ironman event; that year, she won the British Triathlon Federation award for female Long Distance Triathlete of the Year. Her other victories in Ironman Triathlons have been in 2014 in Lanzarote, and in the UK in 2015 and 2016. She qualified for the 2016 Ironman World Championship, and finished ninth, despite breaking her collarbone eight weeks prior to the race. Gossage retired from professional sport to focus on her job; 2020 was scheduled to be her last year.

Academic career
Gossage studied medicine at the University of Cambridge, with her PhD focusing on kidney cancer, and she is a trained cancer doctor. Gossage started working as a specialist registrar in 2009, and now works as an oncology consultant at Nottingham University Hospitals NHS Trust. From 2014 to 2016, she took two years away from her academic career to focus on her sports career.

References

1979 births
Living people
British female triathletes
Alumni of the University of Cambridge
21st-century British medical doctors
British oncologists
Women oncologists
Duathletes